Robin Lindsay McAlpine (born December 1972) is a Scottish campaigner who was the Director of the Common Weal think tank from 2014 to 2021. He has previously worked as a journalist, and was the first director of the Jimmy Reid Foundation.

Biography 
McAlpine is the son of former Labour Party and Scottish National Party Councillor Tom McAlpine and the sociologist and activist Isobel Lindsay.

McAlpine previously worked as a political researcher for Labour MP George Robertson. He also worked as a journalist, and was Deputy Director of Universities Scotland. He later became Director of the Jimmy Reid Foundation.

Common Weal 
McAlpine first began to develop on economic philosophy based around the idea of a 'common weal' at the Jimmy Reid Foundation, before leaving in 2014 to set up the Common Weal project as a think tank in its own right.

In 2016 McAlpine published Determination: How Scotland Can Become Independent by 2021. In January 2021, he asked to step down as Director of Common Weal for the role of Head of Strategic Development after receiving backlash for a highly critical article he wrote about Nicola Sturgeon in connection with the ongoing row with Alex Salmond.

He now writes his own blog.

Bibliography

Books

Papers

References 

1972 births
Living people